Xuxa 3 is the tenth studio album and the third in Spanish language by Brazilian pop singer, television presenter and actress Xuxa. It was released in October 1992 in Latin America, United States and Europe.

Background 
In 1991, El Show de Xuxa entered the air on Telefe, Argentina's largest television network, establishing once artistic career Xuxa. It was shown in more than 17 countries in Latin America and the US Hispanic market, in addition to Spain.

Production 
Xuxa 3 was produced by Michael Sullivan, Paulo Massadas and Max Pierre, with artistic coordination of Max Pierre and Marlene Mattos. The repertoire selection came under command Xuxa, Marlene Mattos, Michael Sullivan and Paul Massadas. Xuxa 3 was recorded in the studios of Som Livre, Viva Voz, Lincoln Olivetti, Yahoo, Roupa Nova e Caverna II.

Release 
Xuxa 3 was launched in Latin America in October 1992. Then Spain and the United States, and in early 1993 in Canada.

Track list

Single

Personnel
Xuxa's Spanish voice direction: Graciela Carballo
Produced by: Michael Sullivan, Paulo Massadas and Max Pierre
Makeup Department: Bernie Grundman Mastering
Mastering Engineer: Chris Bellman
Regency:Jorginho Correa
Photos: Isabel Garcia
Graphic Coordination: Marciso Pena Carvalho
Hair: Fátima Lisboa
Artistic Coordination: Max Pierre and Marlene Mattos
Selection of repertoire: Xuxa, Marlene Mattos, Michael Sullivan and Paulo Massadas
Recording Engineers: Jorge Gordo Guimarães, Luis Guilherme D Orey and Luiz Paulo
Recording Assistants: Marcelo Serôdio, Julio Carneiro, Mauro Moraes, Julinho, Claudinho, Ivan and Billy
Recorded at the studios: Free Sound, Live Voice, Lincoln Olivetti, Yahoo, New Clothes and Cave II
Costume Designer: Sandra Bandeira
Musician: Roberto Fernandes
Voice recording of the adult choir: Graciela Carballo

Release history

References

External links 
 Xuxa 3 at Discogs

1992 albums
Xuxa albums
Spanish-language albums
Children's music albums by Brazilian artists